Alloblennius pictus is a species of combtooth blenny (family Blenniidae). Lotan originally placed this species in the genus Rhabdoblennius. It is found in the northwestern Indian Ocean. Blennies in this species are oviparous. They can reach a maximum standard length of 2.6 centimetres (1.02 inches).

References

External links
 Alloblennius pictus at ITIS
 Alloblennius pictus at WoRMS
 

pictus
Fish described in 1969